Selloane Joyce Tsoaeli (born 10 July 1977) is a female track and field athlete from Lesotho who competes in the heptathlon and the high jump. She was the high jump gold medallist at the 2010 African Championships in Athletics and was a heptathlon bronze medallist at the same event. She also took heptathlon bronze at the 2011 All-Africa Games.

Tsoaeli represented Lesotho at the World Championships in Athletics (2007, 2009) and at the Commonwealth Games (2002, 2010, 2014). She was her nation's flag bearer at the 2010 Commonwealth Games opening ceremony.

She also holds the national marks in the 100 metres hurdles, long jump, triple jump, shot put and javelin throw.

Personal bests
100 metres – 13.29 (2007)
200 metres – 26.07 (2010)
800 metres – 2:15.82 (2010)
100 metres hurdles – 14.62 (2011)
High jump – 1.79 m (2012)
Long jump – 6.02 m (2011)
Shot put – 11.99 m (2011)
Javelin throw – 37.52 m (2012)
Heptathlon – 5590 pts (2011)
Triple jump – 12.72 (2009)

All information from All-Athletics.

International competitions

See also
List of champions of the African Championships in Athletics
Lesotho at the 2009 World Championships in Athletics
Lesotho at the 2002 Commonwealth Games
Lesotho at the 2010 Commonwealth Games

References

External links

Living people
1977 births
Lesotho high jumpers
Lesotho female athletes
Commonwealth Games competitors for Lesotho
Athletes (track and field) at the 2002 Commonwealth Games
Athletes (track and field) at the 2010 Commonwealth Games
Athletes (track and field) at the 2014 Commonwealth Games
World Athletics Championships athletes for Lesotho
Female high jumpers
Lesotho heptathletes
African Games bronze medalists for Lesotho
African Games medalists in athletics (track and field)
Athletes (track and field) at the 1999 All-Africa Games
Athletes (track and field) at the 2011 All-Africa Games